Seyed Ashrafedin Hosseini Gilani (1870–1934) was a combatant poet in Iran's constitutional revolution and the editor of the newspaper Nasim-e-Shomal (meaning Northern Breeze in English).

Early life and education
Ashrafedin born in 1870 in Qazvin. He lost his father when he was only six months old. His paternal heritage was usurped. This brought him and his family into extreme poverty.

Ashrafedin finished his elementary education in his home town then went to Najaf (Iraq) for religious education. He came back to Iran after five years and continued his studies there.

It was in 1906 while living in Rasht (north of Iran) that he got to know the leaders of the constitutional revolution and started publishing the weekly newspaper, Nasim-e  Shomal.

Constitutional Revolution
The revolution in 1906 was suppressed at its early stages. After the bombardment and dissolution of the parliament by Mohammad Ali Shah Qajar, Ashrafedin fled to Eshtehard, in the suburb of capital Tehran. A few months later when he returned to Rasht he became influenced by the leaders of the Social-Democrats of the Caucasus. This effect was later visible in the articles published in Nasim-e Shomal.

Death

Ashrafedin was finally arrested for his anti government activities. The exact date of his arrest in unknown. As it was announced in his newspaper, Nasim-e Shomal, Ashrafedin died on 20 March 1934 in Tehran. He was buried in a cemetery near the city of Rey south of the capital Tehran.The newspaper Nasim-e Shomal did not last long after his death.

References

20th-century Iranian politicians
20th-century Iranian poets
1870 births
1934 deaths
Iranian Islamic religious leaders
People of the Persian Constitutional Revolution
People from Qazvin
20th-century newspaper founders